Boyadzhik is a village in Tundzha Municipality of Yambol Province, Bulgaria.  Situated 22 km west of the city of Yambol, and 8 km southwest of the Bulgarian Air Force's Bezmer Air Base, at an elevation 153 m.  Population 1,514.  It is the birthplace of Ivan Atanasov, the father of John Vincent Atanasoff.

See also
 List of villages in Yambol Province

Sources

Villages in Yambol Province